The Midway State is a Canadian alternative rock band from Collingwood and Wasaga Beach, Ontario, signed to Remedy Records for North America and to Universal Publishing for the world outside. They debuted with Holes in 2008, followed by Paris or India in 2011.

History
The band has done several tours throughout North America and Europe, opening for acts such as Death Cab for Cutie, Silversun Pickups, Kate Nash, Shiny Toy Guns, Mika, Jimmy Eat World, Third Eye Blind and k-os. In May 2007, their song "A Million Fireflies" was featured on the NME compilation disc "Canadian Blast" that was released as a promotion attached to the magazine.

"Never Again" from the album, Holes, was used as the default ringback for customers on the Rogers Wireless network in Canada.

In 2009 the band recorded a cover of Peter Gabriel's "Don't Give Up" with Lady Gaga. They later shot a music video. Never officially released, the track and video were leaked to the world online. The band was nominated for two Juno Awards and voted Best New Artist at the MuchMusic Video Awards by viewers.Their song "Unaware" was featured during the final minutes of the Fox show The O.C.

On Thursday May 5, 2011, they opened for Third Eye Blind at the Sound Academy in Toronto. Their second album, Paris or India, was released on July 19, 2011 and debuted at #42 on the Canadian Albums Chart. On July 25, 2011, they were the support act for their old bandmate, Tyler Armes' band, Down With Webster, at Edmonton's Capital Ex.

In 2016, they released a song called "Crystalized" under the name, Nathan John and the Midway State.

Past members
Nathan Ferraro – Vocals/Piano/Synths
Daenen Bramberger – Drums
Mike Wise – Guitar
Mike Kirsh – Bass

Discography

Paris or India (2011)
 Alive
 Atlantic
 Fire
 All Anew
 Paris or India
 Lightning
 Hartley Salter's Kite
 Heart Of Glass
 Litebrite
 St. Paul And The Wolf

Holes (2008)

 Never Again
 Change for You
 Nobody Understands
 Fireflies
 Unaware
 Can't Stop Waking Up to You
 Holes
 Where Did We Go?
 Hold My Head Up
 Fire Keeps On Burning
 I Know
 No Crying
 Time to Move On (iTunes Bonus Track)

Met a Man on Top of the Hill EP (2007)
 Met a Man on Top of the Hill
 Change for You
 Nobody Understands
 A Million Fireflies

Eponymous (2006)
 Met a Man on Top of the Hill
 Change for You
 Unaware
 Nobody Understands
 A Million Fireflies

Other work
 "Don't Give Up", originally by Peter Gabriel and Kate Bush (Duet with Lady Gaga).
 "True", a Spandau Ballet cover, along with a song of their own titled "New York Sky" was featured in the soundtrack to the film Textuality.
 "Run To You" (a Bryan Adams cover) was used for the promotion of the mini-series Camelot by CBC.

Awards and nominations
In 2009, Holes was nominated for "Best Pop Album", while Ferraro was nominated "Songwriter of the Year" at the Juno Awards
On June 21, 2009, they won "Favourite New Artist" and "Best "Independent Video" for "Never Again" at the MuchMusic Video Awards.

References

Musical groups established in 2007
Musical groups from Ontario
Canadian alternative rock groups
2007 establishments in Ontario